= Benny Heller =

American jazz musician

Benny Heller (died August 16, 1983) was a jazz rhythm guitarist who is known for his work with Benny Goodman. He won a Down Beat Readers' Poll in 1938 and 1940.
